Menachem Ilan (מנחם אילן; born January 18, 1960) is an Israeli former sport shooter.

He is Jewish, and was born in Israel.

He competed for Israel at the 1992 Summer Olympics in Barcelona, at the age of 32, in Shooting--Men's Small-Bore Rifle, Prone, 50 metres, and came in tied for 39th.  He also competed in Shooting--Men's Small-Bore Rifle, Three Positions, 50 metres, and came in 41st.

References

External links
 

1960 births
Living people
Israeli male sport shooters
Olympic shooters of Israel
Shooters at the 1992 Summer Olympics
Jewish sport shooters
Israeli Jews